= Cổ Định chromium mine =

Chromium mine in Thanh Hóa Province, Vietnam

Co Dinh mine
- Location within Vietnam

Location
- Location: Thanh Hóa Province, Vietnam; 19°44′8.02″N 105°36′29.99″E

Production
- Products: Chromium

The Co Dinh mine is a large mine in the north of Vietnam in Thanh Hóa Province. Co Dinh represents one of the largest chromium reserve in Vietnam having estimated reserves of 20.8 million tonnes of ore grading 46% chromium.
